Amina Belouizdad (1931 – 29 September 2015), born Rabia Ali-Chérif, was the first female presenter on Algerian television.

On October 28, 1962 at 6:00 PM, Amina Belouizdad announced the birth of the Algerian Radio and Television (RTA) Channel; which replaced the French Radio and Television (RTF) Channel.  She influenced generations of Algerians at a time when the RTA was the only available channel on television. In 1982, Belouizdad retired.

Life 
Amina Belouizdad was born in 1931 in the neighbourhood of Belcourt (now Belouizdad) in Algiers.

Her father, Tahar Ali-Cherif, who was a lawyer by profession, was born in the Kasbah of Algiers, and her mother, Maghnia Abed, was born in Chlef.

In 1947 she married Zineddine Belouizdad with whom she had three sons.

Career
Prior to the Algerian revolution, Amina was expected to fulfill her duties as a wife and mother as dictated by Algerian traditions and customs. However, in order to supplement the family income, she replied to an offer of employment in 1958 from the French Radio and Television (RTF) channel looking for a television presenter. As a fluently bilingual native, she was hired for the position, also adopting the name "Amina" as it was considered to be more phonetically accessible to a French audience than the name "Rabia".

At the beginning of the Algerian revolution, she devoted herself to supporting wives of imprisoned activists by organizing fundraising. In 1958, she became a bilingual presenter at RTF. She took advantage of her celebrity status to drive her car across military checkpoints to meet militants who, with the help of her husband, stayed in their homes before joining the maquis. One of these militants was Cherif El Hachemi, a colleague at the RTF.

Amina continued her career as a television presenter up until her retirement in 1982. Despite her retirement, her popularity ensured that she would continue to be a reference on cultural matters, especially with regard to Chaabi and Andalusian music which she was very passionate about.

Death
Amina Belouizdad died 29 September 2015 at the age of 83 following a stroke. She was buried in the cemetery of Sidi M'hamed in her native district.

Her last home is between those of her parents, Mohamed Belouizdad and Hassiba Ben Bouali.

References 

1932 births
2015 deaths
Arabic-language television
Algerian television presenters
Algerian women television presenters
21st-century Algerian people